= Kouara =

Town of ancient Lydia

Coordinates: 38°34′52″N 28°41′36″E

Kouara was a town of ancient Lydia, inhabited during Roman times.

Its site is tentatively located near Körez in Asiatic Turkey.
